Burroughs School, also known as Burroughs Graded School, is a historic school located at Conway in Horry County, South Carolina. It was built in three phases between 1905 and 1923. The earliest portion of the building was built as an elementary school and has three main portions of eleven bays.   It features a one-story, hip roof porch supported by six Ionic order columns with Scamozzi capitals. About 1915 a two-story hipped classroom wing was added and in 1923 four classrooms and an auditorium was added to the complex.

In 2014 the Horry County Museum moved into the renovated building from its former location in the historic Conway Post Office building.

It was listed on the National Register of Historic Places in 1984.

Horry County Museum
The Horry County Museum features exhibits about the County's history, pre-history and natural history. Displays include a freshwater aquarium, mounted animals, area military history, Native American artifacts and history, textiles, area beaches, and historic photographs.

Gallery

References

External links

 Horry County Museum
 Burroughs School - Conway, South Carolina - U.S. National Register of Historic Places on Waymarking.com

School buildings on the National Register of Historic Places in South Carolina
School buildings completed in 1905
Museums in Horry County, South Carolina
National Register of Historic Places in Horry County, South Carolina
Buildings and structures in Conway, South Carolina
1905 establishments in South Carolina